Fantomcat is a British animated series produced by Cosgrove Hall Films. It was first broadcast in 1995, and was animated by Alfonso Productions, a Spanish animation studio also responsible for animating and bringing Cosgrove Hall's shows Count Duckula, Victor and Hugo: Bunglers in Crime, Avenger Penguins, Sooty's Amazing Adventures and The Foxbusters to life, Milimetros, another Spanish animation studio, and in-house by Cosgrove Hall themselves. It aired largely on Children's ITV. The series also had a run on Pop from 2003 to 2005. It was the first Cosgrove Hall cartoon to be animated with a process called Animo, wherein the animation drawings were scanned and then digitally coloured on computers. The first series was produced and directed by Ben Turner, while the second one was produced and directed by its creator, Andy Roper.

Influences
The main character of Fantomcat was influenced heavily by Zorro, Errol Flynn and Fantômas, and the series itself was influenced by Batman: The Animated Series and the time-lost approach of both Adam Adamant Lives! and Gargoyles.

Details
Fantomcat centres on the character Phillipe L'Entrique Elan de Chanel, Count Givenchy and Duke of Fantom, a.k.a. Fantomcat, a masked swashbuckling hero who thrived on the stormy evening of 31 December 1699 in mortal combat with his nemesis Baron von Skelter, a sword-wielding caped Skeletoid alchemist. But Von Skelter was not alone in Castle Fantom, as he had brought with him two of his henchmen. During the battle, Phillipe was treacherously cast into a painting within the halls of his home, Castle Fantom, by Von Skelter's henchmen with the Crystal of Malevolence, a stone so powerful that it can change worlds. As his clock struck midnight, he became trapped in the painting for three centuries while Von Skelter stole his Ring of the Fantoms and his sword, Touché.

As time passed, the area around Castle Fantom became a bustling metropolis called Metrocity, a city submerged in crime rings led by the fiendish arachnid Marmagora. Eventually, at midnight on 31 December 1999, Fantomcat is freed from the painting by the members of the Wildcat Detective Agency when they take a wrong turning into the castle while chasing two explosive-wielding reptiles.

On 1 January 2000, Fantomcat joins the Wildcat Detective Agency in their battle against Marmagora and her henchmen, who have used another Crystal of Malevolence to summon Baron von Skelter into the modern day and join her as her partner in a new world order. Fantomcat and the Wildcat Detective Agency defeat Marmagora's henchmen, and blow up Baron Von Skelter with the two Crystals of Malevolence. Although the Baron has been defeated, Marmagora is still hanging around, and the battle will continue another day.

Characters

Heroes
Phillipe L'Entrique Elan de Chanel, Count Givenchy and Duke of Fantom (voiced by Robert Powell) - The main protagonist of the series. A masked, swashbuckling, polite and fearless hero who joins the Wildcat Detective Agency after his release and is nicknamed Fantomcat. Fantomcat is naturally completely oblivious to the modern world and its various new technologies, which can hinder him and the detective team if he is not careful. Fantomcat has a sword called Touché which can respond to his beck and call, has been with him all his nine lives, and was made from the same metal that his great grandfather's sword was made from. He can also turn invisible with the help of his Ring of the Fantoms, a ring a thousand years old whose powers have helped Fantomcat's family oppose evil down the ages. With this ring, he can act like a "Phantom" when needed. In-between adventures, he teaches MacDuff how to be a swordsman.
Sir Randolph L'Entrique Elan de Chanel (voiced by Robert Powell) - Fantomcat's father, who is now deceased. He often appears in the form of a ghost whenever Fantomcat has lost a battle or lost one of his nine lives.
Great Grandfather L'Entrique Elan de Chanel (voiced by Robert Powell) - Fantomcat's great grandfather, who was killed by Nemesis during their first and final encounter. Like Fantomcat's father, he appeared to Fantomcat in the form of a ghost.
Tabitha "Tabs" Wildcat (voiced by Lorelei King) - A stern female detective and leader of the Wildcat Detective Agency, she has a crush on Fantomcat. Her younger sister is Ginger Wildcat, who is the head of the New York Police Department and also has a crush on Fantomcat. She is known as Penelope "Penny" Wildcat in some foreign dubs.
MacDuff the Mouse (voiced by Rob Rackstraw) - A timid member of the Detective Team, who hates holes. His real name is Claude, though as it embarrasses him, he prefers to be called MacDuff. He is also a swordsman-in-training.
Lindbergh the Pigeon (voiced by Jimmy Hibbert) - A member of the Detective Team who talks in garbled, blubbering language, hates heights and therefore will not fly.

Villains
Marmagora (voiced by Lorelei King) - The primary villain of the series. A hideous giant widow spider intent on dominating Metrocity, she is the leader of the evil forces below the city. She has a pet carnivorous plant called Gloria, who takes three weeks to digest her food, and she often feeds her henchman Vile the Bluebottle to Gloria whenever he messes up.
Vile the Bluebottle (voiced by Jimmy Hibbert) - A fly. Marmagora's right-hand man, who does not help her much but only follows her instructions and agrees with everything she says - however, he sometimes has feelings against Marmagora. He normally wields a gun or a sword, and like all flies, can fly.
Vinnie the Vole (voiced by Jimmy Hibbert) - One of Marmagora's henchmen, who is always ready to help. Unlike Vile, Vinnie is actually quite smart, but he always gets shunned by Vile.
Vomit the Fly (voiced by Jimmy Hibbert) - Vile's cousin. He is also Marmagora's "spy in the sky fly", and far smaller than Vile.
The Crab Twins (voiced by Robert Powell and Rob Rackstraw) - Two of Marmagora's second division boys, called Jack and Arthur. They normally wield crowbars and baseball bats, and often target rich people. They are also very good swimmers.
Baron Hugo von Skelter (voiced by Rob Rackstraw) - A sword-wielding caped Skeletoid alchemist who imprisoned Fantomcat for 3 centuries and was summoned over to the present day by Marmagora to finish his heinous conquest. He was formerly a bison scientist, but after experimenting alchemy on himself, he became a Skeletoid set upon the path of evil. He was thought dead after being defeated by Fantomcat in the first episode, but he survived and is now waiting for his revenge on him.
The Monitor (voiced by Rob Rackstraw) - An intergalactic space villain who talks like Shere Khan and destroys planets with a giant laser on his asteroid spaceship. He was thought dead after being sucked out into space in his first appearance, but as he can breathe in space, he survived, and is now waiting for his revenge on Fantomcat. 
Lurk (voiced by Jimmy Hibbert) - One of the Monitor's henchmen, who is a Cockney lizard. He's typically little help, but he has the odd bright moment or two.
Nemesis (voiced by Jimmy Hibbert) - A demon warrior created by a powerful sorcerer in order to wipe out Fantomcat's great-grandfather and ravage the land. He was defeated, but at the cost of Fantomcat's great-grandfather's life. He is again summoned by Marmagora in the form of a Sodium-filled giant robot, and is again defeated with a water cannon. He is fought by MacDuff when Fantomcat ends up in a radiation accident, and once again by MacDuff when Blaine Bunion accidentally summons him. He can be summoned with the incantation "Galiostro acapelto maponos asmodeos azazel!"

Other Characters
Bunty the Mouse (voiced by Jimmy Hibbert) - MacDuff's older brother, who is an inept inventor. He has a habit of calling MacDuff by his real name, which irritates him.
Leandra Bagshot (voiced by Lorelei King) - MacDuff's girlfriend, who is unaware of her boyfriend's life as a detective thwarting Marmagora's schemes.
Police Chief Axel Schmiere (voiced by Rob Rackstraw) - The chief of the Metrocity Police Department, who enjoys eating hamburgers and is scared of Fantomcat.
Hiram "Big" Bucks (voiced by Robert Powell) - Metrocity's biggest billionaire, who owns every industrial business in the city.
The Mayor (voiced by Jimmy Hibbert) - The mayor of Metrocity, who is rather geeky and cowardly, and often works alongside Hiram "Big" Bucks.
Rash Blackhead (voiced by Jimmy Hibbert) - A reporter for Metrocity News Flash who is a big fan of Fantomcat and the Wildcat Detective Agency.

Episode list

Series 1

Series 2

DVD and VHS releases
On 13 January 2003 in the United Kingdom, Cinema Club and Granada Media released 2 DVDs and videos of Fantomcat, one with Episodes 1 and 2, and one with Episodes 3 and 4.

Previously, in 1996, Telstar Home Entertainment released 3 videos as part of their Star Kids range.

So far, the rest of the first series and the second series have not been officially released in the United Kingdom, but bootleg copies of the first and second series exist, and can be requested from ITV Viewer Requests. As of January 2022, both series were made available for streaming on BritBox.

In Serbia, Beokolp released 2 DVDs of Fantomcat, one with Episodes 14, 15, 16 and 10, and one with Episodes 5, 6, 7 and 22.

See also
Zorro
Errol Flynn
Fantômas
Adam Adamant Lives!

References

External links

Toonhound entry for Fantomcat
First episode on YouTube

1995 British television series debuts
1996 British television series endings
1990s British children's television series
1990s British animated television series
British children's animated comedy television series
English-language television shows
ITV children's television shows
Television series by ITV Studios
Television shows produced by Anglia Television
Television series by Cosgrove Hall Films
Animated television series about cats
Television series set in 2000